Tim Klinger (born September 22, 1984 in Wuppertal) is a former German professional road bicycle racer.

Palmares 

 Jadranska Magistrala - Mountains Classification (2006)

External links 
Profile at Gerolsteiner official website

1984 births
Living people
German male cyclists
Sportspeople from Wuppertal
Cyclists from North Rhine-Westphalia
21st-century German people